Mikhail Yefremov may refer to:

 Mikhail Yefremov (actor) (born 1963), Soviet and Russian actor
 Mikhail Yefremov (military commander) (1897–1942), Soviet military commander
 Mikhail Yefremov (politician) (1911–2000), Soviet politician and diplomat